Situácia is the second demo by the Slovak punk rock band Iné Kafe.

Track listing

Personnel
 Marek "Cibi" Cibula - vocals
 Vratko Rohoň - guitar, backing vocals
 Mario "Wayo" Praženec - bass, backing vocals
 Jozef "Dodo" Praženec - drums, backing vocals

References

1997 albums
Iné Kafe albums
Demo albums